Giordano Rocchi (born September 28, 1980) is an Italian former artistic gymnast, born in Rome. She competed at the 1996 Summer Olympics.

References

1980 births
Living people
Gymnasts from Rome
Italian female artistic gymnasts
Gymnasts at the 1996 Summer Olympics
Olympic gymnasts of Italy
21st-century Italian women